The 1969–70 Vehicle & General Australasian knock-out competition was an List A tournament took place from November 1969 to January 1970. It was the first season of the Australian domestic limited-overs cricket tournament. Seven teams representing the six states in Australia, and a New Zealand team, took part in the competition in a knockout format. The competition began on 22 November 1969 when Victoria took on Tasmania at the Melbourne Cricket Ground.

After five matches were played, the final took placed on 1 January 1970 at the Melbourne Cricket Ground between Victoria and New Zealand. After winning the toss, Victoria were bowled out for 129, with New Zealand chasing the total down with six wickets to spare.

Format
The first season of the competition was a straight knockout competition between the six states of Australia and a team that represented New Zealand at domestic level.

Fixtures

First round

Semi-finals

Final

See also
 1969-70 Sheffield Shield season

References

External links
 Cricket Web
 Cricket Australia
 Baggygreen

1969
Australian cricket seasons from 1945–46 to 1969–70
Domestic cricket competitions in 1969–70
1970 in New Zealand cricket
1969 in New Zealand cricket